Magdalena Kozioł (born 14 September 1981) is a Polish judoka.

Achievements

External links
 

1981 births
Living people
Polish female judoka
Place of birth missing (living people)
21st-century Polish women